Digital Life (previously Unwired) was a monthly lifestyle and consumer technology magazine aimed at South African consumers published by technology media house ITWeb. The magazine was started in 2006 and the first issue appeared in October 2006. The magazine ceased publication with the June/July 2010 issue.

References

External links
http://www.digitallife.co.za/

2006 establishments in South Africa
2010 disestablishments in South Africa
Defunct magazines published in South Africa
Lifestyle magazines
Magazines established in 2006
Magazines disestablished in 2010
Monthly magazines published in South Africa
Science and technology magazines
Magazines published in South Africa